Stop at Nothing is a 1991 television film directed by Chris Thomson. The thriller, starring Veronica Hamel and Lindsay Frost, premiered on ABC, and has since been frequently aired on Lifetime Television.

Plot 
Private detective and former Drug Enforcement agent Parrish (Lindsay Frost) is hired to be a bodyguard for a week to 8-year-old Kimberly Howard (Deborah Ann Gorman), who currently serves the key role in the custody battle of her parents James (Joseph Hacker) and Glenna (Annabella Price). James fears that Glenna will run off with Kimberly, considering that she is losing the battle, is refusing alimony and is advised by the judge to seek psychiatric help. James is awarded temporary custody, and hires Parrish for assistance during his work hours. Parrish does not feel comfortable around children, and Kimberly immediately shows her lack of interest in her. Glenna, meanwhile, is heartbroken over having lost the case, and tells her lawyer that she hates how James can abuse Kimberly on a daily basis now. Her lawyer feels sorry for the woman and puts her in contact with former reporter Nettie Forbes (Veronica Hamel), who has spent a year in prison for attempting to murder the man who had abused and killed her daughter. Since then, Nettie specializes in helping mothers to kidnap their children from their abusive husbands, and she offers Glenna a new identity following the kidnapping of Kimberly.

Meanwhile, Parrish grows closer to Kimberly and even tells her about her love of her life: a former colleague who was shot and killed by a man who they were arresting. Their conversation is interrupted by a sudden visit from Nettie and Glenna, who have Parrish under gunshot and take Kimberly. While they head out to a safehouse and come up with a new name, Parrish is criticized by her colleagues for having failed her job. James insists on Parrish trying to find Kimberly, informing her that she is not safe with Glenna, who was institutionalized three years ago following a manic-depressive episode. Parrish's partner Sgt. Jake Morris (Robert Desiderio) – with whom Parrish has had a romantic past – arrests Nettie, but she does not talk throughout her holding. Instead of being convicted, Nettie is released, enabling the police to follow her every move. Nellie, however, gets rid of them via a drive-in, and surprises Glenna with a new birth certificate, of Carol Davidson.

While Nettie and Glenna prepare to leave for Mexico, Parrish locates them and begins a dangerous car chase. Glenna finally gives up and gets out the car to stop Parrish, while Nellie drives off with Kimberly. Nellie puts Kimberly to stay with her friend, but Kimberly does not feel safe and cries out for her mother. Back at the station, Parrish looks into the rape allegations against James. Through Glenna's lawyer, Parrish finds out that Kimberly brought up the abuse claims herself, and that Glenna's so-called mental illness is nothing more than a depression. Even though there is no hard proof for the abuse, Parrish slowly starts to believe the lawyer, and offers to help Nettie to reconcile Glenna with Kimberly. Nettie wants to help Kimberly break out of jail, but this is no option for Parrish, who does not want to jeopardize her career.

Meanwhile, the FBI locates Kimberly through one of Nettie's posted letters. Parrish tries to help her out by warning Kimberly's caretaker Victoria before the FBI can get to her, but Victoria is unavailable, and the police are able to take Kimberly. As soon as she is reconciled with James, Parrish offers her babysitting services to continue the battle to help Glenna. Charges against Glenna are dropped on condition that she leaves the state, and Nettie is thereby released from any allegations as well. Shortly after, following a confession about the child abuse from Kimberly herself, Parrish arranges for Glenna to leave the state with Kimberly. To assure herself of not losing her job, Nettie shows up and fakes to have cuffed her, before having kidnapped Kimberly. Believing that she was part of the kidnapping, James threatens to sue Parrish, but she assures him that she will tell everyone about the abuse if he does.

Cast
 Veronica Hamel as Annette 'Nettie' Forbes
 Lindsay Frost as Sarah McConnell Parrish
 David Ackroyd as Agent Conroy
 Robert Desiderio as Sergeant Jake Morris
 Joseph Hacker as James Howard
 Deborah Ann Gorman as Kimberly Howard
 Caroline McWilliams as A.J. Parker
 Annabella Price as Glenna Howard
 Francis X. McCarthy as Dean Bowles
 Lou Beatty Jr. as Sergeant Wade
 Ingrid Oliu as Ofelia
 Al Ruscio as Judge Quentin

References

External links

1991 television films
1991 films
American thriller drama films
1990s thriller drama films
ABC Motion Pictures films
1991 drama films
Films directed by Chris Thomson (director)
1990s English-language films
1990s American films